The following is a list of state forests in Indiana by area. The first three tie as number one, so they are listed in alphabetical order.

See also
 Indiana Department of Natural Resources
 List of Indiana state parks
 List of Indiana state lakes
 List of U.S. National Forests

Indiana
State forests